Lamade is a surname. Notable people with the surname include:

Bianka Lamade (born 1982), German tennis player
 Dietrick Lamade, German-born founder of American newspaper Grit
Lawrence L. Lamade (born 1947), American lawyer

See also
 Howard J. Lamade Stadium, in South Williamsport, Pennsylvania, named after a son of Dietrick Lamade